Aasma: The Sky Is the Limit is a Bollywood film released on 23 January 2009.

Synopsis 
It is a story about a theatre group composed of college students who are talented and aspiring actors. They are unable to get acting offers and then their main sponsor (Sachin Khedekar) backs out of the group. From then on, the group tries to overcome several hurdles, and all of a sudden, it is discovered that the main character Shubh has HIV disease.

Cast 
Shubhashish
Seema Biswas
Hrishitaa Bhatt

Music 
Music direction for the film was provided by Sajid Ali and Mohammed Afsar. Rahat Fateh Ali Khan provided vocals. Other singers include KK, Shaan, Kailash Kher, Mahalaxmi and Debojit. Call (band) was also involved in the music of this film as well as Xulfi.

References

External links

2009 films
2000s Hindi-language films